Bethany Sachtleben (born February 9, 1992) is an American long-distance runner. In 2019, she won the silver medal in the women's marathon at the 2019 Pan American Games held in Lima, Peru.

In 2019, she competed at the 2019 USA Cross Country Championships held in Tallahassee, Florida without winning a medal.

References

External links 
 

Living people
1992 births
Place of birth missing (living people)
American female long-distance runners
Athletes (track and field) at the 2019 Pan American Games
Medalists at the 2019 Pan American Games
Pan American Games silver medalists for the United States
Pan American Games medalists in athletics (track and field)
Pan American Games track and field athletes for the United States
21st-century American women